Systolosoma is a genus of beetles and one of two extant genera family Trachypachidae, containing two species, Systolosoma breve and Systolosoma lateritium, which are endemic to Chile and Argentina

References

 George E. Ball, "Trachypachidae", in Ross H. Arnett, Jr. and Michael C. Thomas, American Beetles (CRC Press, 2001), vol. 1

Adephaga genera